The Princes of Florence is a German board game designed by Wolfgang Kramer and Richard Ulrich published in 2000 by Alea in German and by Rio Grande Games in English. Players assume the roles of Florentine Princes who wish to design their own villas to allow artists to create great works of prestige. Through seven rounds, each containing an auction phase and two action phases, the Princes pay for landscaping, buildings, freedoms, and various services and bonuses. At the end of the seven rounds, whoever has the most Prestige Points wins.

The release of a revised edition has been announced by game publisher Korea Boardgames for October 2022 when they plan to present the game at the SPIEL '22 convention.

Gameplay
Over seven rounds, players use the cards in their hands to hire various artists, scientists and architects. Each profession has a set of preferences and requirements that players have to fulfill and awards work points that can be converted into money or victory points. Money can be used to acquire buildings or landscape features in auctions to be able to better match the requirements of different professionals. Whoever has the most victory points by the end of round seven wins the game. An interesting strategic element is that whenever new buildings are placed in the player's villa, they may not touch other buildings, unless certain conditions are achieved first. This leads to not always being able to purchase the most advantageous buildings if they be fitted into the playing area.

Awards and rankings
 Winner, Meeples' Choice Award 2000
 Winner, International Gamers Award 2001
 Winner, Nederlandse Spellenprijs 2007
 Winner, Lucca Game - Best Game Mechanics 2007
 Winner, Tric Trac d'Or 2007
 Winner, Ludoteca Ideale Official Selection 2008
 Winner, As d'Or - Jeu de l'Année Prix Spécial du Jury 2008
 4th Place, Deutscher Spiele Preis, 2000
 Ranked #8 on BoardGameGeek (as of March 2008)
 Nominee, MinD-Spielepreis 2010

External links
 Alea's Die Fürsten von Florenz Homepage (German)

Notes 

Auction board games
Wolfgang Kramer games
Alea games
Rio Grande Games games
Board games introduced in 2000